Courage of the West was a 1937 "B" movie directed by Joseph H. Lewis in which  Bob Baker made his debut as a singing cowboy.

Production

The film was the first production that Joseph H. Lewis directed.
75 non-union cowboys were hired in Sonora to work on the movie. Lewis was told that the Screen Actors Guild did not have jurisdiction at this distance from Los Angeles, although its members would have to be paid the standard rates agreed with the Guild.
Filming was completed in seven days.
This movie, Baker's first, was thought to be his best. The others suffered from predictable plots and poor scripts.
Lois January, the love interest in the film, said, "Bob Baker was too pretty! He was nice, but didn't get friendly. He didn't want me to sing a song in his picture. That business is full of jealousy...". The railroad scenes were filmed on the Sierra Railroad in Tuolumne County, California.

Synopsis

The film is set during the American Civil War. It begins with a scene in which President Abraham Lincoln establishes the "Free Rangers" to protect gold shipments from the west.
The film then tells the  story of a ranger, played by J. Farrell MacDonald, who adopts the son of a convicted outlaw. The son is played by Bob Baker. He grows up and becomes the head of the Rangers. He finds himself in pursuit of a gang of gold robbers, not knowing that their leader is his natural father. After various twists and turns, the father is shot and the hero marries the girl with whom he has fallen in love, played by Lois January.
During breaks in the action, Baker sings Resting Beside the Campfire, Ride Along Free Rangers, Song of the Trail, and I'll Build a Ranch House on the Range.
Fleming Allen wrote all these songs.

Reception

A New York Times review said, "Nothing of cult director Joseph H. Lewis' much-vaunted flair is on display in this average musical Western".

Notes and references
Citations

Sources

1937 Western (genre) films
1937 films
Universal Pictures films
Films directed by Joseph H. Lewis
American Western (genre) films
American black-and-white films
1930s English-language films
1930s American films